G. P. Schafer Architect is a New York City-based architectural firm established in 2002 and led by founder and principal Gil Schafer III. Its work has been featured in Architectural Digest, Town & Country, Veranda and The New York Times, and in books on classical and residential architecture, restoration and interior design. G. P. Schafer Architect has won Institute of Classical Architecture & Art (ICAA), Palladio and American Institute of Architects awards, as well as the Veranda "Art of Design" Award in Architecture. Architectural Digest has named the firm to the AD100 since 2012 and describes its residences as contemporary tributes to traditional craftsmanship that are "appreciative of the vernacular expression of 18th- and 19-century design movements." Martin Filler wrote that the firm's work is distinguished by its "sense of proportion and restraint, not only in measurement but also in terms of what is correct in a given setting." Rizzoli International has published two books by Gil Schafer, The Great American House (2012) and A Place to Call Home (2017).

History 
Gil Schafer III (born 1961 in Cleveland) founded G. P. Schafer Architect in 2002 in New York City. The firm occupied space in a SoHo high-rise on Lafayette Street for several years, and by 2007, had executed 25 projects with a staff that had grown to fifteen. By 2018, its staff numbered thirty-five, and the practice took over a fourth-floor aerie on Union Square West in Manhattan.

Schafer is the grandson and great, great grandson of architects. He spent his childhood in places including New Jersey and the Midwest, California, and the Bahamas; including his grandmother's antebellum plantation in Thomasville, Georgia. He studied Growth & Structure of Cities at Haverford College and Bryn Mawr (BA, 1984), before attending Yale School of Architecture (MA, 1988). At Yale, he trained as a modernist under Thomas Beeby, Frank Gehry, Josef Paul Kleihues, Bernard Tschumi and Robert Venturi, and earned the school's H. I. Feldman Prize for studio work in his final semester.

As a student, Schafer worked for Charles Moore and William Turnbull Jr., and upon graduating, for Bernard Tschumi. He joined Ferguson Shamamian & Rattner in 1991, working there until 1999, when he started his own practice. Between 1999–2006, he was president, and then chairman, of the Institute of Classical Architecture & Art. Schafer writes and lectures on traditional residential architecture, and has served on Yale School of Architecture’s Dean’s Council, the Dutchess Land Conservancy, and the Thomas Jefferson Foundation.

Projects 
G. P. Schafer Architect is best known for what writers call "new old houses"—contemporary adaptations of classical styles suggesting long histories and regional authenticity—and restorations of historic homes. Architect and architectural historian Robert A. M. Stern places the practice among the "leaders in a new generation of Classical and traditional architects." The firm's influences include 18th- and 19-century American design movements and figures such as Colonial Revival architects Charles A. Platt and William Lawrence Bottomley, Sir Edwin Lutyens, and David Adler and Frances Adler Elkins.

Architecture critics distinguish G. P. Schafer Architect's approach by its concern for context, climate, and lifestyle; interplay between historical precedent, details, materials and craftsmanship; mix of classical order, proportion and contemporary function; and integration of architecture, landscape and decoration. The latter aim often involves collaborations that serve as complements or foils to the firm's classicism, such as those with interior designers Rita Konig, David Netto, Miles Redd and Michael S. Smith, landscape designer Deborah Nevins, decorator Bunny Williams, and color consultant Eve Ashcraft.

"New old houses" 
Schafer's early project, "Middlefield" (Dutchess County, New York, 1999), demonstrates the approach elaborated in his first book and set the mold for the firm's new-old aesthetic. Following a long and unsuccessful attempt to find a suitable nineteenth-century Greek Revival house to renovate, he decided to design and build a new, modern rendition, carefully sited to integrate into a 45-acre land parcel. The residence combines contemporary features and regional farmhouse vernacular, with classically proportioned details derived from 19-century builder pattern books by Asher Benjamin and Minard Lafever and a two-story, Greek Doric columned entry portico that Martin Filler wrote "would likely win the approval of Thomas Jefferson."

Several later projects demonstrate the firm's creation of organic, architectural mythologies in new constructions. Architectural Digest described the amalgam of styles at "Longfield Farm (Dutchess County, New York, 2006) as embodying "a picturesque historical narrative" of successive additions—Colonial Revival main house of rugged fieldstone, Federal-style wing, neo-Victorian carriage barn, and Greek Revival entry portico and back porch—blended into a "transcendent whole." "New Plantation Residence" (South Georgia, 2016) combines an "original" mid-19th-century Greek Revival structure with what appears to be a 1930s Colonial Revival hunting lodge addition.

The simple exterior shapes, ambience and details of the Colonial Revival "Willow Grace Farm" (Millbrook, New York, 2007) were modeled after a nearby dilapidated, loosely Federal-style dwelling its client had purchased; the 9,000-square-foot residence and outbuildings incorporate wide-plank floorboards, door hinges, beams and fixtures salvaged from the older structure alongside elements detailed to match. "New Classical House" (Hudson Valley, 2007) blends Jeffersonian palladian classical precedents and regional Greek Revival elements in a five-part symmetrical design with a contemporary interior layout in a palette of teals, blues, and greens.

Restorations & renovations 
The firm executed a four-year restoration of the 1843 Greek Revival "William C. Gatewood House" (Charleston, 2008), a four-story residence whose Tuscan columns, arched colonnade and multistory piazza, and high second-floor parlor rooms typify the antebellum Charleston single house. The commission stipulated the retention of all original walls, but entailed a literal disassembly and reconstruction (due to structural damage), as well as detection for traces of original features that had been altered. The restoration integrated modern function and flow patterns into the original historic framework with Greek Revival and vernacular decoration, period furnishings and fixtures, Charlestonian pumpkin-hued walls, hand-painted scenic wallpaper, and restored nine-foot triple-hung windows, mantels and woodwork.

The Georgian farmhouse "Boxwood" (Nashville, 2010) involved working on a residence designed by one of Schafer's influences, American classicist Charles A. Platt. The renovation sought to restore the understated classical formality that had been diluted by significant alterations, while contemporizing the home with modern living space, decoration and detail. On the exterior, the firm created a more unified aesthetic by redesigning a 1950s portico to match Platt's vision and painting the re-clad brick white. Inside, it restored the loggia's French doors and eliminated outmoded barriers between utilitarian, formal public and informal areas by opening the space and adding enfilades.

The renovation of Schafer's "House by the Sea" (Brooklin, Maine, 2017) represents a departure from the firm's historical houses that The New York Times describes as "breezily modern." Initially an undistinguished, early-1990s chalet lacking an architectural back story, the barn-like near-A-frame (including a double-height, 30 x 30-foot great room) offered the opportunity for experimentation. It was gutted to the timber frames and rebuilt inside and out, with large windows, tall glass sliding doors, and dormer windows installed to maximize light and views of Blue Hill Bay. The interior—painted all white to enhance the light and views—bridges New England tradition and modernity with painted wood-plank walls and hardware reflecting rural history alongside eclectic, centuries-spanning furnishings.<ref name="SchaferHG">Gil Schafer III, "Total Recall," 'House & Garden, October 2017.</ref>

 Additional residences 
Schafer's second book, A Place to Call Home, explores the roles of geography, place and lifestyle in design, a theme visible in several projects that draw on regional vocabularies and context. The new "Waterfront House in the Adirondacks" (Lake Placid, New York, 2013) is a modern adaptation of the Gilded-Age family compound; the exterior of the asymmetrical structure employs a tailored, less-known Adirondack-style of brown clapboard siding, green-shingled roof and white trim. "Mill Valley Hillside Residence" (California, 2013) entailed the transformation of a derelict assemblage of structures on a small, sloped lot (originally an 1880s YWCA bunkhouse) into a larger, modern family cottage.Michelle Slatalla, "Garden Visit: Landscaping a Live-In Summer Camp," Gardenista, December 27, 2016. Accessed November 15, 2019.

Two New York residences demonstrate the firm's approach to city life, which writers describe as seeking a balance between traditional and modern, sophistication and comfort.David Masello, "Townhouse Revival," Milieu, Winter 2016. Accessed November 19, 2019. The renovation, "Greenwich Village Townhouse Apartment" (2003), restored period style and craftsmanship to an 1850s residence covered over with modernist additions, while updating its layout. "Fifth Avenue Apartment" (2016) combines formal architectural details—including a columned entry foyer right off the elevator framing a panoramic view of Central Park—with a relaxed, open plan and modern colors to create a residence amenable to formal entertaining, family life, and a contemporary art collection.

 Awards and recognition 
G. P. Schafer Architect won the Institute of Classical Architecture & Art's (ICAA) Arthur Ross Award in 2019 and ICAA Stanford White Awards for two residences (Longfield Farm and Fifth Avenue Apartment, both 2013), the New York Historical Society Library project (Interior Design and Decoration Award, 2014), and a collaboration with Voith & Mactavish Architects on Thorndale Farm Corporate Offices (Commercial, Civic and Institutional Architecture Award, 2016).Traditional Building, "Traditional Architecture Awards," December 1, 2016. Accessed January 19, 2019. In 2009, G. P. Schafer Architect received two American Institute of Architects awards: a New York State Award of Merit for the William C. Gatewood House and a Westchester/Hudson Valley Citation Award for Willow Grace Farm. It has also received Palladio Awards for Thorndale Farm Corporate Offices (2018), Willow Grace Farm (2009), Greenwich Village Townhouse Apartment (2004), and Middlefield (2002). The firm has been recognized with Veranda magazine's "Art of Design" Award in Architecture (2010) and been regularly named to the Architectural Digest annual AD100 since 2012.Architectural Digest, "G.P. Schafer Architect," 2019 AD 100, Architectural Digest, December 12, 2018. Accessed November 15, 2019.

 Publications 
Schafer has written two books, The Great American House (2012) and A Place to Call Home (2017). He has also contributed forewords to The New Old House by Marc Kristal (2016) and Thomasville: History, Home and Southern Hospitality by William R. Mitchell (2014), a chapter to Bunny Williams's A House by the Sea (2016), and a section to the Institute of Classical Architecture & Art book, A Decade of Art & Architecture 1992–2002 (2002).William R. Mitchell, Thomasville: History, Home and Southern Hospitality, Golden Coast Publishing, 2014. Accessed November 18, 2019.

 References 

External links
G. P. Schafer Architect official website
Gil Schafer III author page, Amazon
Architectural Digest Aesthete'' Podcast, "Inside/Out, the Marriage of Architecture and Landscape" with Gill Schafer
Architect Gil Schafer, "How to Decorate" podcast, Ballard Designs

20th-century American architects
21st-century American architects
New Classical architects
Architecture firms based in New York City
Design companies established in 2002
2002 establishments in New York (state)